Włodzimierz Czarzasty (born 3 May 1960) is a Polish politician who serves as the co-chairperson of the New Left party.

Biography
Born in Warsaw, Poland, Czarzasty graduated with degrees in journalism and political science from the University of Warsaw in the 1980s. Simultaneously, he was a member of Polish Students' Association (ZSP), leader of association "Ordynacka", and a  member of Polish United Workers' Party (PZPR) from 1983 to 1990.

Following the fall of Communism, Czarzasty became a member of SLD, the successor of PZPR. In the 1997 general election, he ran for the SLD but lost. In May 1999, he was appointed to the National Council of Radio Broadcasting and Television by the President Aleksander Kwasniewski. He became a point of controversy during the Rywin corruption scandal, but he was not formally charged with any crime.

After a long extra-parliamentary career, Czarzasty ran as part of United Left (ZL) party in the 2015 election. Since ZL has not passed the 8% threshold required to hold seats in the Sejm, none of the candidates, including Czarzasty, won.

During the party leadership election in January 2016, Czarzasty defeated former MP Jerzy Wenderlich and was elected as the new president of Democratic Left Alliance, replacing the incumbent leader and former Prime Minister Leszek Miller. He was a candidate for the Masovian Regional Assembly during the local elections in 2018, but lost.

Sejm

In the 2019 parliamentary election, Czarzasty co-led the Lewica coalition, together with Adrian Zandberg and Robert Biedroń, and was elected to the Sejm. He was a candidate from Sosnowiec constituency. On 12 November 2019, Czarzasty was elected Deputy Marshal of the Sejm in representation of Lewica.

In July 2021, Czarzasty  suspended the party member rights of Karolina Pawliczak and five other New Left MPs after they disagreed with him and made their disagreement public. The suspended politicians sent a letter to Czarzasty in which they questioned the fact that certain political commitments were made on behalf of the party, and allowed their letter to be public.  Czarzasty accused them of an action grossly violating the obligation to care for the good name of the party. Pawliczak said: "Democracy, not bullying; talking, not suspending and expelling from the party ... I want to continue building such a democratic party with my friends."

Electoral history

References

External links 
 

1960 births
Living people
Politicians from Warsaw
Democratic Left Alliance politicians
University of Warsaw alumni
Deputy Marshals of the Sejm of the Third Polish Republic
Members of the Polish Sejm 2019–2023